Vilaür is a municipality in the comarca of Alt Empordà, Girona, Catalonia, Spain.

The municipal term is to the right of the Fluvià river. There is a flat sector along the river and the rest is stuck by the mountains that mark the end of the Alt Empordà fluvial plain (140 m maximum altitude to the east). In 2005 it had 115 registered inhabitants. It is grouped around the parochial church and conserves remains of the medieval walled area. It forms a small monumental complex, outside which there are several farmhouses. The main economy is agriculture, livestock and the wood industry. Vilaür is a toponym that is considered formed by the Catalan word vila and a Germanic personal name. The town celebrates the festival in July, on Saint James's Day.

References

External links
 Government data pages 

Municipalities in Alt Empordà